Metarranthis homuraria, the purplish metarranthi, is a species of geometrid moth in the family Geometridae. It is found in North America.

The MONA or Hodges number for Metarranthis homuraria is 6828.

References

Further reading

External links

 

Ennominae
Moths described in 1868